Horowitz Ridge is a rock ridge between David Valley and King Valley in the Asgard Range of Victoria Land, Antarctica. It was named for Professor Norman Horowitz of the California Institute of Technology, whose interest in the analogy of Antarctica to Mars led him to suggest the value of Victoria Land dry valley studies in regard to Martian life detection. The studies were undertaken in 1966–68 by a United States Antarctic Research Program biological party led by Roy E. Cameron, who suggested the naming.

References

Ridges of Victoria Land
McMurdo Dry Valleys